Roads in Thailand may refer to:
Controlled-access highways in Thailand
Thai Expressway network
Thai motorway network
Elevated Tollway
Thai highway network